William Goodell may refer to:

 William Goodell (abolitionist) (1792–1878), American abolitionist and reformer
 William Goodell (gynecologist) (1829–1894), American gynecologist
 William Goodell (missionary) (1792–1867), American missionary
 William Newport Goodell (1908–1999), American artist, craftsman, and educator